Mylian Jimenez (born 13 January 2003) is a Dutch footballer who plays as a midfielder for Jong PSV.

Early life 
Jimenez was born in Nijmegen in the Netherlands. He is the son of a Colombian father and Dutch mother.

Club career 
He signed his first professional contract on 5 September 2019, tying him to the club until 2022. He attracted interest from foreign clubs after captaining PSV's U19 team coached by Ruud van Nistelrooy to win a youth tournament in China. Jimenez reportedly turned down interest from Valencia, Atlético Madrid, and Sampdoria to sign a contract for PSV.

On 3 May 2021, Jimenez made his debut for Jong PSV (the reserve team of the club), coming on as a substitute in a 0–0 draw against TOP Oss.

International career 
Jimenez is an international for Netherlands youth teams. He has previously represented his nation at U16 and U17 level.

Career statistics

References 

2003 births
Living people
Footballers from Nijmegen
Dutch footballers
Dutch people of Colombian descent
Association football midfielders
PSV Eindhoven players
Jong PSV players
Eerste Divisie players
Netherlands youth international footballers